The European Democratic Party (EDP) (French: Parti Démocrate Européen; PDE) also known as the European Democrats, is a centrist European political party in favour of European integration. François Bayrou is the President of the party.

All MEPs of the European Democratic Party currently sit in the Renew Europe group.

The youth wing of the EDP is the Young Democrats for Europe.

As of 2022, EDP member parties participate in the government of one country: France (Democratic Movement). A European region is also led by an EDP politician, with the Basque Country being led by Iñigo Urkullu of the Basque Nationalist Party, and EDP member Free Voters participate as a coalition partner in the government of Bavaria.

History 
European Democratic Party was initiated on 16 April 2004 and formally founded on 9 December 2004 in Brussels.

François Bayrou of the Union for French Democracy and later the Democratic Movement (MoDem) and Francesco Rutelli, former leader of the Democracy is Freedom and Alliance for Italy parties, served as the two co-presidents until 2019. Now, François Bayrou serves as the only president.

The EDP was founded in reaction to the rising influence of Eurosceptic parties within European institutions.  It drew pro-European centrist parties from the European People's Party (EPP) group to form a new centrist multinational bloc. Its co-founder François Bayrou described it as a party for people being neither conservative nor socialist." 

Since the beginning of the 6th European Parliament of 2004–2009, the EDP has formed a joint European parliamentary group with the Alliance of Liberals and Democrats for Europe Party called the Alliance of Liberals and Democrats for Europe (ALDE) group. This parliamentary group was dissolved in 2019 and replaced by Renew Europe.

The European Democratic Party is ideologically centrist and federalist. Some major members and affiliated parties like EAJ-PNV, Free Voters, MoDem, MCC, Canarian Coalition and the disbanded Democracy is Freedom – The Daisy follow a Christian democratic or liberal conservative line.

Members
Members are national and regional political parties as well as members of the European Parliament, national and regional parliaments.

Former member parties

  : National Forum (Nacionalni forum), joined EDP in 2014, disbanded in 2015
 : 
European Party
Citizens' Alliance
 : 
Party for the Open Society
Way to Change, founding member of EDP, disbanded in 2009
 : Union of Democrats and Independents joined the ALDE party on 2 December 2016
 : 
Democracy is Freedom – The Daisy, founding member of EDP, merged into the Democratic Party in 2007, MEPs Mario Pirillo, Silvia Costa and Vittorio Prodi stayed as individual members until 2014, now member of PES
Alliance for Italy, party disbanded by the end of 2016
European Democratic Party Italy (Partito Democratico Europeo Italia) disbanded in 2021.
 : Labour Party, left in 2012 to join the ALDE party
 
 PRO Romania (PRO România), left in 2022 to join Party of European Socialists
 Association of Italians of Romania, left in 2022
 : 
People's Party – Movement for a Democratic Slovakia, joined EDP in 2009, disbanded in 2014, succeeded by Democratic Slovakia Party
Democratic Slovakia Party ('Strana Demokratického Slovenska') and European Democratic Party in 2019
Alena Bašistová (Independent), not reelected in 2020

Elected representatives of Member Parties

European institutions

References

External links
EDP official website

 
Alliance of Liberals and Democrats for Europe
Pan-European political parties